Jákup Pauli Gregoriussen (born 24 April 1932 in Tórshavn, Faroe Islands) is the leading architect of the Faroe Islands. He is also a graphic artist and author of publications about the Faroese church.

Life

Jákup Pauli was born in 1932 to the fashion designer Liffa Gregoriussen (née Arge) and the sailor Magnus Gregoriussen. He was educated at the architectural school of the Royal Danish Academy of Art in Copenhagen.

Among his best-known buildings are the Listasavn Føroya (1970) and its extension to become the National Art Museum in 1993. As a graphic artist, he designed stamps for the Postverk Føroya and illustrated books. His main themes are views of towns and villages, not only in the Faroes but also from his travels, including, amongst others, Russia, Poland, Rome, and Egypt.

In 1998, he was awarded the Faroese Literature Prize (M. A. Jacobsens Heiðursløn) for his four volume work about the Faroese churches (1995–1999). It is his bibliophilic masterpiece, luxuriously illustrated and informative about the Faroese churches and the history of the Faroe Islands from a regional point of view. Gregoriussen is an important advisor on the restoration of Faroese churches.

Buildings

1979: Faroese National Library
Broadcasting building in Útvarp Føroya
Pharmacy in Klaksvík
New savings bank in Tórshavn
1995: Listasavn Føroya

Stamps
The stamps he drew for the Postverk Føroya are representative of Gregoriussen's graphical artwork. 
Old farmhouses, February 9, 1987, engraved by Czesław Słania (series of 4 stamps)
Old houses in Norðragøta, October 5, 1992 (series of 4 stamps)
Suðuroy, January 26, 2004 (miniature sheet of 10 stamps)
Christmas stamps, September 20, 2004; they depict the largest churches of the Suðuroy island, in Vágur and Tvøroyri.

Books
For the books where Gregoriussen was not the author, but only contributed the illustrations, the name of the author is given.

Ferðatekningar. Tórshavn: Egið forlag, 1986 (50 p., travel drawings, self-published)
Tórshavn, vár miðstøð og borg. Gøta: Aldan, 1989 (110 p., drawings of Tórshavn)
Jógvan Arge: Havnarmenn í Gundadali: Havnar Bóltfelag 1904–1954. Tórshavn: Havnar Bóltfelag, 1994. (256 p., festschrift "90 Years HB Tórshavn")
Kirkjurnar í Føroyum. In Faroese, in four volumes. The author has opulently illustrated these books (award-winning, definitive work).
Gomlu trækirkjurnar. Velbastað: Forlagið í Støplum, 1995  (227 p., about the old wooden churches) Information
Eldru hválvkirkjurnar. Velbastað: Forlagið í Støplum, 1997  (308 p., about the older vaulted churches; English summary: The Old Vaulted Churches, p. 306–308) Information
Yngru hválvkirkjurnar. Velbastað: Forlagið í Støplum, 1998.   (316 p., about the newer vaulted churches; English summary: The New Vaulted Churches, p. 314–316) Information
Nýggjaru kirkjurnar. Velbastað: Forlagið í Støplum, 1999  (326 p., about the newer churches; English summary: Modern Churches in Faroe, p. 324–326) Information
Tórshavn vár miðstøð og borg II: tekningar úr Havn. Velbastað: Forlagið í Støplum, 2000.  (104 p., drawings from Tórshavn, including 85 coloured drawings, 2nd volume. Summary in Danish and English)
Um heimsins borgir. Velbastað: Forlagið í Støplum, 2002.  (112 p., "Über die Prachtbauten der Welt") (In German)

Literature
Gunnar Hoydal, Palle Dyreborg, Curt von Jessen, Karen Zahle, Kim Dirckinck-Holmfeld: Færøsk arkitektur = Architecture on the Faroe Islands. Copenhagen: Arkitektens Forlag, 1996.  (166 p., Danish and English)

1932 births
Living people
People from Tórshavn
Danish architects
Faroese writers
Faroese stamp designers
Faroese artists
Faroese Literature Prize recipients
Royal Danish Academy of Fine Arts alumni